Yhonny Albeiro Ramírez Lozano (Medellín, May 23, 1983) is a Colombian professional footballer who plays in Categoría Primera B for Leones FC as a defensive midfielder.

External links
Yhonny Ramírez at playmakerstats.com (English version of ogol.com.br)

1983 births
Living people
Footballers from Medellín
Colombian footballers
Envigado F.C. players
Real Cartagena footballers
Boyacá Chicó F.C. footballers
Millonarios F.C. players
Atlético Junior footballers
Association football defenders